Hasekura (written: 支倉) is a Japanese surname. Notable people with the surname include:

, Japanese writer
, Japanese samurai and daimyō

Japanese-language surnames